Bloodfist III: Forced to Fight (also known as Forced to Fight and Forced to Fight: Bloodfist III) is a 1992 American martial arts crime action film directed by Oley Sassone and starring Don "The Dragon" Wilson, Richard Roundtree, and Gregory McKinney. It was written by Allison Burnett. It was the final film in the series to be released theatrically, as the other five sequels went straight-to-video.

Plot
Jimmy Boland (Don Wilson) has been sentenced to a California maximum-security prison for a murder that he didn't commit. When he sees some black prison inmates sodomizing his friend, he flies into a rage and kills the gang leader. The prison warden, in an effort to do Jimmy in, transfers him to the black wing of the prison, where he is sure the black prisoners will dispatch him quickly. This looks to be a safe bet, since the gang member Jimmy had killed was a drug supplier to Blue, the leader of the black prison gang. Wheelhead, a white inmate and leader of a group of white supremacists, takes Jimmy under his wing and offers Jimmy support if he joins the gang. Jimmy refuses, preferring to stay neutral. Meanwhile, Jimmy warms up to his cellmate Stark (Richard Roundtree), and Stark invites Jimmy to join a multi-racial group of prisoners who tend the rooftop prison garden. Jimmy has managed to maintain his neutrality, but at a price. Now both Blue and Wheelhead want to see him dead.

Cast
Don "The Dragon" Wilson as Jimmy Boland
Richard Roundtree as Samuel Stark
Stan Longinidis as Leadbottom
Gregory McKinney as Blue
Rick Dean as Wheelhead
Richard Paul as Goddard
Charles Boswell as Taylor
John Cardone as Diddler
Brad Blaisdell as Pisani
Tony DiBenedetto as Tony D.
Andre Rosey Brown as Clint
J.W. Smith as Sporty Black
Laura Stockman as Connie
Kevin N. Davis as Stewart
Pete "Sugarfoot" Cunningham as Champ
Bob Schott as Weird Willy
Joe Garcia as Chicago
Angelo Callahan as French Fry
Jon Freedman as Guard
Max Hunter as Inmate Palmer
J.C. Motes as Prison Guard

Release
Bloodfist III received a limited release theatrically from Concorde Films in January 1992.  It ended up grossing $35,154 at the box office.

New Concorde Home Entertainment released the film on DVD in 2000 along with Bloodfist, Bloodfist II, and Bloodfist IV: Die Trying.  The DVD is currently out-of-print.

References

External links

1992 films
1990s crime films
1990s English-language films
American action films
Bloodfist films
American martial arts films
American prison films
American sequel films
Kickboxing films
1992 martial arts films
1990s American films